Underdog is a character developed by The Gate London advertising agency and animated by Aardman Animations. The character is featured in advertisements for the personal injury claims company, National Accident Helpline, a UK-based provider of personal injury services.

Origins
Underdog was created in 2010 for the insurance provider National Accident Helpline, as a claymation figure (often seen with bandages on his arms, legs and ears).  The character made his first TV appearance in the same year. The initial concept of Underdog was created by The Gate London advertising agency, where Dave Trott is chairman. The design of Underdog bears a close resemblance to that of the principle characters from Aardman's earlier TV series Rex the Runt created by animator Richard Starzak.

History
Underdog first appeared in ads standing in the shadow of a tall figure voiced by Brian Blessed, using his catchphrase "I've had an accident!" as a way of persuading the tall man to give him compensation for an unspecified injury. When the tall man refuses to do so, Underdog tells him that he will go to National Accident Helpline instead to get proper compensation for his injury. The ads end with the tall man trying to convince Underdog to come to him for compensation instead, and Underdog hurling an insult at him intended to reduce him to less than his tall stature and deep voice convey. Background music of the Underdog advertising campaigns have included such hits as Chumbawamba's “Tubthumping” and Marvin Gaye's "I Heard It Through the Grapevine" (where the chorus lyrics have been changed to include the brand name). Underdog is voiced by British comic actor Joe Pasquale.  The most recent run of ads (beginning in September 2013) featured computer-generated imagery created by Aardman Animations.

Commercial success and popularity
Following the first Underdog campaign, the number of enquiries increased by 25% within the first month. The immediate effects of the campaign also saw cost per enquiry down by 8% and the number of brand searches for 'national accident helpline' triple.

The Underdog character has his own Pinterest board featuring images sent to National Accident Helpline by fans, ranging from Underdog shaped cakes to Underdog crochet figures.

TV Adverts 
 First Ads – 21 September 2010 - 4 May 2012
 Knocked Down – 4 August 2012
 Grapevine – 10 January 2013
 Bad Dream – 1 September 2013
 Revolving Doors – 7 September 2013
 No Win, No Fee, No Risk Guarantee - 8 October 2013
 Giant Books – 1 January 2014
 Red Tape – 5 March 2014
 Connect, Click and Claim – 4 June 2014
 Justice Express 1 - 27 March 2015
 Justice Express 2 - 27 March 2015
 Make NAH Your Port of Call - 27 March 2015
 Loudhailer - 23 June 2015
 Aquarium - 23 June 2015

References

External links

Stop motion characters
Advertising characters
Fictional dogs
Male characters in advertising
2010 in British television
Mascots introduced in 2010
British television commercials